Tupi Paulista (before 1953: Gracianópolis) is a municipality in the state of São Paulo in Brazil. The population is 15,583 (2020 est.) in an area of 245 km². The elevation is 400 m.

References

Municipalities in São Paulo (state)